Unigo is an online business matching students with colleges, scholarships, internships, student loans, majors and careers.  According to USA Today, “millions of students use Unigo to assist in their college search.”  Education publisher McGraw-Hill wrote “Unigo is the largest and most authoritative library of college reviews on the internet.”

In 2014, the firm was acquired by EDPlus Holdings, LLC. In July 2016, EDPlus Holdings soldUnigo.com, along with EStudentLoan.com, to Education Dynamics.

Services 

Unigo.com includes 650,000 college reviews, 3.6 million scholarships, 90,000 internships and 3.3 million study materials, as well as a marketplace of 20,000 academic tutors, professional college counselors and online courses.  The site has 2 million registered users and receives 14 million unique visitors per year.

At B2e.unigo.com, the firm provides enrollment and market research services to more than 50 colleges and universities.  Unigo also owns and operates Cinergy Education, a firm providing n higher education marketing services.  The firm also owns and operates PrepTalk and UnigoConnec, t that license technology to colleges for recruitment, student retention and alumni networking.

Unigo owns the student loan marketplace estudentloan.com and provides student loan information for Bankrate.com.   Unigo Student Funding partners with colleges to originate and service student loans.

Media partnerships 

Unigo provides college information for many mainstream media brands including U.S. News & World Report, 
ABC News, Money Magazine and The Huffington Post.  Thefirm co-founded the brand WSJ On Campus with The Wall Street Journal and created the 152-page print title "The USA Today / Unigo College Guide" with USA Today.  The firm also created high schools curriculum and tutoring services with McGraw-Hill Education.

Investors 

Unigo's investors include The Wall Street Journal, McGraw-Hill Ventures and Aequitas Capital.  The company has been awarded education grants by Facebook, The Gates Foundation and The NYC Board of Education.  It has received recognitions from The Webby Awards, the Association of Educational Publishers, the Viacom Foundation and The White House.  Unigo reaches more than 50% of all college-bound students and provides services to approximately 9 million consumers each year.

References

Other sources

American review websites
Educational technology companies of the United States